Qeshlaq-e Galam Ali may refer to:
Qeshlaq-e Galam Ali Hajj Hoseyn
Qeshlaq-e Galam Ali Hajj Savad
Qeshlaq-e Galam Ali Safar